Folonzo is a town in the Niangoloko Department of Comoé Province in south-western Burkina Faso. The town has a population of 1,618.

Annual rainfall in the area is approximately 1100mm. Dry season is from January to June.

Studies of Glossina tachinoides, a species of tsetse fly, have been conducted on the Komoé River at Folonzo.

A non profit organization, L’association Idéal de Folonzo conducts literacy classes with local children.

Gallery

References

External links
Satellite map at Maplandia.com

Populated places in the Cascades Region
Comoé Province